A rainbow flag is a multicolored flag consisting of the colors of the rainbow. The designs differ, but many of the colors are based on the spectral colors of the visible light spectrum. 
The LGBT flag introduced in 1978 is the most recognized use of a rainbow flag.

History

In the 18th century, American Revolutionary War writer Thomas Paine proposed that a rainbow flag be used as a maritime flag to signify neutral ships in time of war. 

Contemporary international uses of a rainbow flag dates to the beginning of the 20th century. The International Co-operative Alliance adopted a rainbow flag in 1925.  A similar flag (ca. 1920) is used in Andean indigenism in Peru and Bolivia to represent the legacy of the Inca Empire. Since 1961, the international peace flag, also known as the PACE flag, has been especially popular in Italy and to a lesser extent Europe and the rest of the world. The pride flag has represented gay pride since 1978 and evolved into a symbol of the LGBT movement. There are several independent rainbow flags in use today.

Rainbow flags in various cultures and movements

Reformation (1525)

The reformer Thomas Müntzer (1489–1525) connected socially revolutionary claims with his preaching of the gospel
(Genesis 9:11-17, Isaiah 40:8, 1 Peter 1:25). 
He is often portrayed with a rainbow flag in his hand. The Thomas Müntzer statue in the German town of Stolberg also shows him holding a rainbow flag in his hand.
In the German Peasants' War of the 16th century, the rainbow flag together with the peasants' boot ("Bundschuh") was used as the sign of a new era, of hope and of social change.

The choice of the rainbow in the form of a flag harkens back to the rainbow as a symbol of biblical promise. According to the Bible, God first created the rainbow as a sign to Noah that there would never again be a worldwide flood, also known as the Rainbow covenant.

Armenian Republic proposed flag (1919)

A rainbow flag was proposed for Armenia when it regained independence after World War I. It was designed by Armenian artist Martiros Saryan. It was not adopted as the country instead went with three stripes using the colors used in a past Armenian kingdom. The artist used muted, richer colors reflecting Armenian fabrics and carpets.

Cooperative movement (1921)

A seven-colour rainbow flag is a common symbol of the international cooperative movement. The rainbow flag has been the cooperative emblem since 1921 when the International Co-operative Congress of World Co-op Leaders met in Basel, Switzerland to identify and define the growing cooperative movement's common values and ideals to help unite co-ops around the world.

In Essen, Germany in 1922, the International Co-operative Alliance (ICA) designed an international co-op symbol and a flag for the first "Co-operators' Day," which was held in July 1923. After some experiments with different designs, a famous French cooperator, Professor Charles Gide, suggested using the seven colours of the rainbow for the flag. He pointed out that the rainbow symbolized unity in diversity and the power of light, enlightenment and progress. The first co-op rainbow flag was completed in 1924 and was adopted as an official symbol of the international cooperative movement in 1925.

In 2001, the ICA's official flag was changed from a rainbow flag to a rainbow logo flag on a white field, to clearly promote and strengthen the cooperative image, but still use the rainbow image. Other organizations sometimes use the traditional rainbow flag as a symbol of cooperation.

Like the rainbow, this flag is a symbol of hope and peace. The seven colours from flags around the world fly in harmony. Each of the seven colours in the co-operative flag have been assigned the following meaning:

The ICA has been flying a flag with its official logo since April 2001, when its Board decided to replace the traditional rainbow flag. Its use by a number of non-cooperative groups led to confusion in several countries around the world.

Peace movement (1961)

This rainbow flag in Italy was first used in a peace march in 1961, inspired by similar multi-coloured flags used in demonstrations against nuclear weapons. It became popular with the Pace da tutti i balconi ("peace from every balcony") campaign in 2002, started as a protest against the impending war in Iraq. The most common variety has seven colours, purple, blue, azure, green, yellow, orange and red, and is emblazoned in bold with the Italian word PACE, meaning "peace".

Common variations include moving the purple stripe down below the azure one, and adding a white stripe on top (the original flag from the 60s had a white stripe on top). This flag has been adopted internationally as a symbol of the peace movement.

Andean indigenism (1973, 2009)

The Flag of Cusco was introduced in Peru in 1973, and became used as the official emblem of the city of Cusco.  In 2007, the municipality decided to modify the flag design so that it would not be confused with the Gay Pride flag. The new flag design was implemented in 2021. In Ecuador, a rainbow emblem is used by the Pachakutik political party (1995), which is composed mostly of left-wing indigenous people.

A seven-striped rainbow flag design is used in Peru, Bolivia and Ecuador as a symbol of native ethnic groups and culture, and is anachronistically associated with the Tawantin Suyu, or Inca territory.  Although commonly believed in Peru to be a flag of the Incan Empire, the oldest known rainbow flag dates back only to the 18th century and was used by Túpac Amaru II during  his indigenous revolt against the Spanish.  María Rostworowski, a Peruvian historian known for her extensive and detailed publications about Peruvian Ancient Cultures and the Inca Empire, said about this: "I bet my life, the Inca never had that flag, it never existed, no chronicler mentioned it". The National Academy of Peruvian History has stated on the topic: "The official use of the wrongly called 'Tawantinsuyu flag' is a mistake. In the pre-Hispanic Andean world the concept of flags did not exist, it did not belong to their historic context".

LGBT (Lesbian, Gay, Bisexual, Transgender) Pride (1978) 

The rainbow flag was popularized as a symbol of the gay community by San Francisco artist Gilbert Baker in 1978. The different colors are often associated with "diversity" in the gay community (but actually have literal meanings). The flag is used predominantly at gay pride events and in gay villages worldwide in various forms including banners, clothing and jewelry. 
Since the 1990s, its symbolism has been transferred to represent the extended "LGBT" (lesbian, gay, bisexual and transgender) community. In 1994, for the 25th anniversary of the Stonewall riots in New York city, a mile-long rainbow flag was created by Baker which he later cut into sections that were distributed around the world.

The flag was originally created with eight colors, but pink and turquoise were removed for production purposes, and since 1979 it has consisted of six colored stripes. It is most commonly flown with the red stripe on top, as the colors appear in a natural rainbow. Aside from the obvious symbolism of a mixed LGBT community, the colors were determined to symbolize: 

 life (red),
 healing (orange),
 sunlight (yellow),
 nature (green),
 harmony/peace (blue),
 spirit (purple/violet).

The removed colors stood for sexuality (pink) and art/magic (turquoise).

During the 1980s, a black stripe representing AIDS victims was added to the bottom of a rainbow flag as a seventh color and named the "Victory Over AIDS" flag. At various times other colors have been introduced to modify the flag design by Gilbert Baker, including black-and-brown for people of color in 2017, and white-pink-blue for transgender and queer people in 2019.

Basque nationalism (1978)

The leftist Herri Batasuna party used a rainbow version of the Ikurriña (Basque national flag) from 1978 until it was dissolved in 2001.

Jewish Autonomous Oblast (1996)

Another variation of rainbow flag is used by Jewish Autonomous Oblast, situated in the Far Eastern Federal District of Russia, by the Chinese border. Proportions 2:3. Adopted first of October 1996.

The Jewish Autonomous Oblast has a flag with a seven-colour rainbow. The number of colours is meant to symbolize the seven-branched Jewish Menorah. Its colours are slightly different from the basic spectral colours, with gold in place of yellow, vivid blue instead of light blue, and indigo as dark blue. In 2013, the flag was checked according to the Russian gay propaganda law. JAO flag was confirmed as safe because of white background, white borders to the stripes and the seventh (light blue) colour.

Support for the NHS (2020)
During the 2020 coronavirus pandemic in the United Kingdom, the rainbow symbol has been used to signify support and gratitude for the National Health Service (NHS). However, the increasing association of the six-color Pride rainbow flag with the NHS has caused concern among some members of the LGBT community that it is being disassociated "as a symbol of LGBT equality" and may lead to the erasure of identity.

Other rainbow flags

Use of rainbow flag in various settings

Use of rainbow flag colors in different designs

See also
 Rainbows in culture

References

 
Activism flags
Peace symbols
Types of flags